Targowska may refer to the following places in Poland:

Targowska Wola
Targowska Wólka